Richard Athil Udall (May 11, 1811 – March 31, 1883) was an American politician.  

Udall, the only son of Dr Richard and Prudence (Carll) Udall, was born in Islip, Long Island, New York, May 11, 1811.

Udall graduated from Yale College in 1830.  He studied law with his brother-in-law, Judge Selah B. Strong, of Setauket, Long Island; but his father's advanced age and dependence upon him prevented his entering on practice. He spent his life in Islip, and on three occasions (in 1842, 1846, and 1866) represented his district in the New York State Assembly.  His inclinations and tastes led him, however, to prefer the comforts of his home life to the exertions and contests involved in seeking political or professional advancement. General Udall (as he was universally called) was eminently social and hospitable and enjoyed vigorous health throughout his life; he became blind, however, in 1875, but operations for cataracts were performed on both eyes in January, 1876, and his sight restored. He had a stroke of paralysis and apoplexy combined, on March 29, 1883, from the effects of which he died two days later, in his 72nd year, in the village of Babylon, in Islip.

He left two daughters by his first marriage with Hannah Willets.  He was married for a second time, February 5, 1845, to Marie Antoinette, eldest daughter of Timothy P. Carll, of Babylon, who survived him, with one son and one daughter.

Attribution

External links

1811 births
1883 deaths
Yale College alumni
Members of the New York State Assembly
People from Islip (town), New York
19th-century American politicians